The Disabled Students Allowance (DSA) is a Government grant in the United Kingdom (UK) available to students in Higher Education, originally established by the Department for Education and Skills (DfES).

Background

The scheme is for students in England and Wales, with a similar scheme in Scotland and Northern Ireland 
DSA's are grants to help toward meeting the additional studying costs or expenses that students face as a direct result of a disability or specific learning difficulty. They are intended to help disabled students study on an equal basis with other students. Full-time, part-time and postgraduate students all qualify for help. DSA's are paid on top of the standard student finance package and are not means-tested.

The Disabled Students Allowance consists of three elements:
 an Equipment Allowance
 a Non-medical Helpers Allowance
 a General Allowance

In addition to this, in certain circumstances, there is the possibility that additional travel related expenses can be met.

All approved expenditure must be in relation to course / education related support. The equipment allowance is used to obtain assistive technology (e.g. computer software and hardware, recording devices, ergonomic items) which may be required to facilitate full access to the course and the institution. Non-medical help relates to any human support, such as note-taking or the use of sign language interpreters, that may be required. The general allowance is typically used to cover the cost of sundry items. Possible examples include paying for internet connections, books (under some circumstances), ink cartridges and paper, photocopying or coloured overlays.

The DSA was established in 1993 and is not a Student Finance Direct initiative.  The administration of this grant in England has been transferred from Local Education Authorities (LEA)'s to Student Finance England for new applicants in 2009. In Wales it will remain the responsibility of the Welsh Assembly Government, and continue to be administered by the individual local authorities.

To receive funds from the DSA, students must pass the basic eligibility checks for Student Finance Direct products as well as the criteria for disability, by providing the funding body with written proof of the disability from a medical professional. For those with a specific learning disability (e.g. dyslexia, dyspraxia) suitable proof can be in the form of a report from an appropriately qualified and approved individual such as an Educational Psychologist or Specialist Teacher.

The only other requirement is that any report be completed when the individual in question is over the age of sixteen. The potential benefits, in terms of equipment (such as a new laptop computer and specialist software) can be significant for students identified as dyslexic.

Most universities will be able to put students in touch with an appropriately qualified person who can assess them and produce an acceptable report. For other disabilities and medical conditions correspondence from a doctor or consultant is generally sufficient. The Funding Body then asks the student to have an Assessment of Need to establish exactly what assistance is required from The DSA and the student's institution -see  for accredited Centres. DSA QAG, who were the governing body have closed down .

Disabled students should be aware that the cost of any needs assessment is met from the total amount of DSA available to them. The Assessment Centre is paid for their work from the student's DSA funds (approximately £660 - £800 a time) and while this reduces the total amount of funds available to the student it is recognised by the funding bodies as being an effective way of detailing the support package and resources the student requires and of ensuring that the support package addresses all the student's needs and includes appropriate warranties and insurance. Assessment Centres (which are audited for this work) are also charged with ensuring "value for money".

The Assessment of Need is intended to identify the specific details of support for each individual student. Lasting anywhere from 90 to 180 minutes (sometimes more, split over more than one appointment, for complex cases) they should cover all of the potential support needs that may arise including the institutional provisions necessary.

A report is produced that contains recommendations for support, including any equipment.

For students with dyslexia these reports can seem similar, with good reason, but might contain subtle differences which align the support package to the individual needs of the student.

The recommendations contained within the report have to be "approved" by the student's funding body; there are strict guidelines followed by Funding Bodies to ensure that the support provided fulfils the purpose of the DSA.

All disabled students should be aware that the award is made to them as individuals and they are free to source approved equipment on their own, with the consent of the funding body and subject to the limits approved. However, it is often more convenient and less troublesome for students if they take advantage of the offer by funding bodies to order equipment on behalf of the student (via DSA QAG approved suppliers) and by assessment centres/HEIs to organise the support a student needs. This can only be done if the student agrees.

Students are encouraged by Funding Bodies, to only use DSA-QAG approved equipment suppliers - these suppliers have agreed to meet the terms of a service level agreement set out by DSA-QAG and if anything goes wrong with their equipment will receive a more understanding response from their funding body. Many Assessment Centres have their own preferred suppliers (who will be DSA-QAG approved) who they will work closely with. This will be an arrangement arising out of a wish to ensure that the students receiving specialist equipment are well supported by a supplier. It also means that a very small number of suppliers are able to provide equipment and therefore control the market.

Once approval is given, arrangements for purchase of equipment and facilitation of human support (where appropriate) can be made. Once equipment is received by the student it is deemed to be their property.

Universities often have the ability to facilitate human support and training in-house. Increasingly though, as HEIs start to appreciate the complexities of quality support service provision, this function is being outsourced. Some Assessment Centers also provide this kind of support although the issue of Conflict of interest can arise, which they must address as a result of being DSA-QAG Accredited Centres: a cosy grouping of interested parties such as assessment centres and equipment suppliers operating a closed shop to keep control and monopolise the whole business.

Training providers and those facilitating human support to students with disabilities are able to add an administration premium when invoicing a student's funding body. This is regarded as acceptable practice within higher education to meet the overhead costs - e.g. recruiting, training, payroll, insurance etc. but does impact negatively upon the funds available for supporting each individual. However, this does avoid the difficulties students would experience if they were to employ their own support workers - i.e. of employer responsibilities including tax and NI. Although students could avoid the requirement to directly employ support workersby utilising third party service providers.

Higher Education institutions receive a nominal amount of funding for each student confirmed as being in receipt of DSA . This comes from the Funding Council and not out of individual student's DSA. The institutions therefore have a vested (financial) interest in identifying as many students eligible to claim DSA as possible and in getting them to apply for DSA.

In Autumn 2000 the grants were extended to include those studying part-time as well as full-time. The DfES estimated that in the year 2002–03, 25,000 DSA claims were accepted in the UK.

A report on the BBC Ouch! website in 2003 claimed that some disabled students did not have their equipment and/or an agreement in place from their LEA when they arrived at university.  SKILL, the National Bureau for Students with Disabilities, a charity that helps disabled students in Higher education, claimed that, this was due to the "Efficiency of the LEA, coupled with fitting into an assessment timetable all within the short time-frame between exam results being released (mid-August) and the start of the new term at university (late September)". That same year though, new working methods were introduced that helped cut down any delays.

Prospective students planning to enter higher education are free to apply for DSA from approximately the March prior to the commencement of their course. Students already enrolled on a course can apply at any time. However, SFE and other funding bodies will make financial decisions taking into account the amount of time a student's course has to run. Those administering the funds are responsible for ensuring they are spent in an appropriate manner and it is very unlikely that a student applying for the first time with just a few months of a course left would receive recommendations and approval for a large package of support, especially in terms of equipment.

Currently the amount of funding from DSA for a full-time undergraduate is:
Equipment allowance - £5,161 - over the course
Non-medical help allowance - £20,520 - per annum
General allowance - £1,724 - per annum 

The equipment allowance amount is for the duration of the course. The non-medical help and general allowances are annual figures. Where payable there is currently no upper limit on travel expenses. Part-time students receive proportionate amounts depending on the intensity of their study. Postgraduates have not previously been as well funded as undergraduates.

See also
Disability Discrimination Act 1995
Education in the United Kingdom
Equal opportunity
Universities in the United Kingdom

References

External links
Higher Education - disabled students
List of DSA Assessment Centres
Student Loan Company
A2B Assessments Independent DSA Resource and Assessment Centre

Disability law in the United Kingdom
Higher education in the United Kingdom